Linda Villarosa (born January 9, 1959) is an American author and journalist who is a former executive editor of Essence magazine. She has worked on health coverage for Science Times. She is also author of several books, and her first novel, Passing for Black, was nominated for a Lambda Literary Award in 2008.

Personal life
Villarosa was born on January 9, 1959. Her mother Clara Villarosa is also an author, publisher and motivational speaker. Linda Villarosa is a graduate of the University of Colorado and spent a year at Harvard University as a journalism fellow. She also earned a master's degree in urban journalism/digital storytelling in 2013 from the CUNY Graduate School of Journalism. She lives in Brooklyn with her partner, two children and pets.

Career
Linda Villarosa has covered women's and African-American health issues in The New York Times, The Root, O Magazine, Glamour, Health, Vibe and Woman’s Day. She was nominated for a GLAAD Media Award in the Outstanding Magazine Article category for an article in Essence titled "Pride and Prejudice."

She is a co-founder of Villarosa Media, other co-founders being her mother Clara Villarosa and sister Alicia. In 2008, her first novel, Passing for Black, was published. She is author and co-author of three books, including Body & Soul: The Black Women’s Guide to Physical Health and Emotional Well-Being. Villarosa worked as a consultant to provide editorial expertise to companies and organizations like American Express Publishing and Meredith. She also directs the undergraduate journalism program at the City College of New York.

References

1959 births
LGBT academics
American LGBT writers
Living people
American magazine editors
Women magazine editors
20th-century American journalists
20th-century American women writers
21st-century American journalists
21st-century American novelists
21st-century American women writers
University of Colorado alumni
CUNY Graduate School of Journalism alumni
City College of New York faculty